The Jiuling Mountains are a range of mountains located in Jiujiang, China.

Description
The Jiuling range is a subrange of the Luoxiao Mountains forming parallel ridges oriented in a southwest/northeast direction.

References

Mountain ranges of Jiangxi